Lush Lashes is a thoroughbred filly that won the Coronation Stakes at Royal Ascot and the Musidora Stakes in York in 2008. She is owned and trained by Jim Bolger and was sired by Galileo out of Dance For Fun.

References

2005 racehorse births
Racehorses bred in the United Kingdom
Racehorses trained in Ireland
Thoroughbred family 16-a